Marzuq Maarman is a South African rugby union player, currently playing with Romanian SuperLiga side Timișoara Saracens. His regular position is prop.

Career

Youth
He then moved to Pretoria, where he played for the  team in the 2011 Under-19 Provincial Championship competition and was in the  squad for the 2012 Under-21 Provincial Championship competition. He returned to Port Elizabeth later that year.

Senior career

References

South African rugby union players
Eastern Province Elephants players
Living people
1992 births
SCM Rugby Timișoara players
Rugby union props
Rugby union players from Port Elizabeth